Andrena rosae  is a Palearctic species of mining bee.

References

External links
Images representing Andrena rosae 

Hymenoptera of Europe
rosae
Insects described in 1801